1000 Ways to Lie is a special and spin off of the television series 1000 Ways to Die. It recreates intricate lies that people have told, as well as how, and what happened when they were found out. It also includes interviews with experts who describe the science behind each lie. The special aired on Spike on March 3, 2010.

Stylizations
The special is in the style of its parent show, by telling the location and date with a border that has the words "Liar", "Deception", "Greed", "Money", "Shame", "Secrets" and "Betray" surrounding a picture of the incident. At the end of each summary, there is another picture of the incident, and the "Way to Lie #" and the nickname for the incident typed over the image in yellow "Sin City" font, mocking the 1000 Ways to Die presentation. At the beginning of the episode there is a sped-up voice over that is merely the voice over from 1000 Ways to Die with a few words changed around:

The disclaimer then cuts to animation while the voice-over reads (note: only the ALL CAPPED words are illustrated)
"Everybody lies, and everybody gets lied to...We lie to get ahead, we lie to get the girl, and to keep our secrets. Whether motivated by greed, ego, or criminal intent, just when you think you've heard it all, there are 1000 WAYS TO LIE."

Failed pilot episode
Originally aired March 3, 2010, the first episode was to be called "Natural Born Liars", but because it got negative reviews, 1000 Ways to Lie became a special instead of a spin-off, and "Natural Born Liars" is no longer an episode title. 1000 Ways to Lie hasn't aired again since.

References

External links
 
 

2010 television specials
American television spin-offs
Spike (TV network) original programming
Television series by Original Productions